The 2015 BetVictor Welsh Open was a professional ranking snooker tournament held at the Motorpoint Arena in Cardiff from 16 to 22 February 2015. The tournament was staged in Cardiff for the first time since 2004, having moved from  Newport.
 		
Ronnie O'Sullivan was the defending champion, but he lost 3–4 against Matthew Stevens in the last 32.

The best-performing Welsh player was Mark Williams, who reached the semi-finals of the tournament for the first time in 12 years. He lost 5–6 to Ben Woollaston, who reached the first ranking final of his professional career.

John Higgins defeated Woollaston 9–3 in the final to win the Welsh Open for a record fourth time and claim his first ranking title in two and a half years.

Prize fund
The breakdown of prize money for this year is shown below:

Winner: £60,000
Runner-up: £30,000
Semi-finals: £20,000
Quarter-finals: £10,000
Last 16: £5,000
Last 32: £2,500
Last 64: £1,500

Highest break: £2,000
Total: £300,000

Main draw
128 players started the tournament, with the first four rounds played over the best of 7 frames. The quarter finals were played over 9 frames with the semi finals over the best of 11. The final was over 17 frames.

Top half

Section 1

Section 2

Section 3

Section 4

Bottom half

Section 5

Section 6

Section 7

Section 8

Finals

Final

Century breaks

 140, 101  Luca Brecel
 137, 135, 134, 105, 103, 101  John Higgins
 136  Matthew Stevens
 135, 131, 120, 114  Mark Selby
 133, 101  Mark Allen
 132  Joe Perry
 131, 116, 113, 103  Neil Robertson
 130  Thepchaiya Un-Nooh
 125, 106, 101  Matthew Selt
 122  Peter Ebdon
 119  Alex Borg
 117, 106, 102  Shaun Murphy
 116, 101  Stephen Maguire
 115, 105, 107  Marco Fu
 112  Ding Junhui
 110, 104  Judd Trump
 109  Anthony McGill

 108, 105, 103  Mark Williams
 108, 103  Ben Woollaston
 108  Ricky Walden
 107  Chris Wakelin
 106  Ronnie O'Sullivan
 104  Jimmy White
 104  Elliot Slessor
 104  Dechawat Poomjaeng
 103  Mark Joyce
 103  Gerard Greene
 103  Ali Carter
 102  Fergal O'Brien
 102  Jamie Jones
 101  Rod Lawler
 100  Ken Doherty
 100  Jamie Cope
 100  Alan McManus

References

Welsh Open (snooker)
Welsh Open
Welsh Open
Welsh Open
Sports competitions in Cardiff